Delaram District is a temporary district of Nimruz Province in Afghanistan. It has a mixed population consisting of ethnic Pashtuns, Baloch, and Tajik. The capital of the district is the city of Delaram.

See also
Districts of Afghanistan

References

Districts of Nimruz Province